Mark Holtzapple is a chemical engineering professor at Texas A&M University.  His research focuses on technologies that improve sustainability.

Life

Childhood
In 1956, Mark Holtzapple was born to Joan Carol and Arthur Robert Holtzapple in Enid, Oklahoma. In his early years, Mark's father was an Air Force pilot, so the family moved frequently. After Enid, his family moved to Dover, Delaware, and then to Japan.  In 1961, his father left the Air Force to become an architect and his family returned to the United States to live in York, Pennsylvania. In 1972, the family moved to Bloomington, Minnesota where he graduated from Bloomington Lincoln High School in 1974.

Education
In 1978, Mark Holtzapple earned his B.S. in chemical engineering at Cornell University. In 1981, he earned his Ph.D. in chemical engineering from the University of Pennsylvania.

Career
From 1981 to 1985, Mark Holtzapple served in the U.S. Army, mostly stationed at the United States Army Natick Soldier Research, Development and Engineering Center, where he rose to the rank of captain.  There, he researched water desalination and microclimate cooling, a method to prevent heat stress in soldiers encapsulated in chemical protective clothing.

In 1986, he joined the Department of Chemical Engineering at Texas A&M University. Dr. Holtzapple's research interests include the following: fuels and chemicals from biomass, food and feed processing, water desalination, high-efficiency air conditioning, high-efficiency engines, jet ejectors, compressors, expanders, conversion of waste heat to electricity, high-torque electric motors, and vertical-lift aircraft.

Awards and honors

Teaching
 Fluor Distinguished Teaching Award, 2012
 Professor of the Year, AIChE Student Chapter, 2008
 Corps of Cadets Teaching Award, 2002
 Tenneco Meritorious Teaching Award, 2001
 AIChE Student Chapter Award of Excellence, 1992
 Tenneco Meritorious Teaching Award, 1991
 Texas A&M Association of Former Students Distinguished Teaching Award for Texas A&M, 1991
 Dow Excellence in Teaching Award (Tenured Faculty), 1991
 Texas A&M Association of Former Students Distinguished Teaching Award for the College of Engineering, 1990
 General Dynamics Excellence in Teaching Award, 1990
 AIChE Student Chapter Award of Excellence, 1989
 AIChE Student Chapter Award of Excellence, 1988
 Dow Excellence in Teaching Award (Untenured Faculty), 1988

Research
 Dean of Engineering Excellence Awards, 2016
 Odebrecht Award for Sustainable Development, 2014
 William Keeler Memorial Award for Contribution, 2014
 College of Engineering Faculty Fellow (sponsored by George Armistead, Jr.), 2014
 USAA (United Services Automobile Association) Distinguished Lecture, 2010
 Commercialization Rising Star Award, Research Valley Partnership, 2008
 Chevron Faculty Fellow, 2008
 Halliburton Professorship Award for Excellence in Teaching and Research, 2008
 Excellence in Innovation Award, Texas A&M University, 2007
 Walston Chubb Award for Innovation, Sigma Xi, 2006 
 Top 100 Energy Technology, New Energy Congress, 2006 
 Texas A&M University Distinguished Lecture, 2006
 Texas A&M Ingenuity Award, 2003
 Testified at field hearing before U.S. House of Representatives, 2003
 Halliburton Professorship, 2002–03
 Ford Fellowship, 2001
 Brockett Professor, 2000
 TEES Senior Fellow, 1999
 TEES Faculty Fellow, 1998
 McGraw-Hill Environmental Champion Award, 1997
 TEES Fellow, 1996
 Presidential Green Chemistry Challenge Award, 1996
 TEES Fellow, 1995
 Who's Who in Science and Engineering, 2nd Edition

Military
 First Prize, Army Science Symposium, 1986
 U.S. Army Meritorious Service Medal, 1985
 Petroleum Basic Course Distinguished Military Graduate, 1982
 Officer Basic Course Distinguished Military Graduate, 1981
 ROTC Distinguished Military Graduate, 1978
 American Society of Military Engineers National Citation, 1977
 American Society of Military Engineers Scholarship, 1977
 Four-year Army ROTC Scholarship, 1974

Academic
 Texas A&M Commencement Keynote Speaker, 2009
 McGraw-Hill Science, Engineering, and Mathematics Group's First Edition of the Year Award, 2006
 Who's Who Among America's Teachers, 1996
 Cornell Graduate with Distinction, 1978

Public Service
 Bush Excellence Award for Faculty in Public Service, 2013

Teaching 
Dr. Holtzapple currently teaches thermodynamics, unit operations laboratory, foundations of engineering, bioprocess engineering, and seminar.  Previously, he has taught introduction to chemical engineering, reaction kinetics, and bioprocess engineering.  He co-authored Foundations of Engineering and Concepts in Engineering.

Commercialization Activities
Dr. Holtzapple's research has resulted in two spin-off companies.

Earth Energy Renewables
Earth Energy Renewables was founded to commercialize the following technologies:

 MixAlco process — involves the bioconversion of biomass to mixed alcohol fuels, industrial chemicals, and hydrocarbon fuels such as gasoline and jet fuel.
 SoluPro — involves the conversion of proteins, such as chicken feathers, into a soluble syrup

StarRotor Corporation
StarRotor Corporation was founded to commercialize the following technologies:

 Compressors — these high-efficiency devices employ gerotor geometries to compress gases and vapors
 Expanders — these high-efficiency devices employ gerotor geometries to expand gases and vapors
 Engines — a gerotor compressor and expander are combined in a recuperated Brayton cycle that is 2 to 3 times more efficient than traditional piston engines

Sources 
 Texas A&M Department of Chemical Engineering Faculty: Mark Holtzapple 
 Texas A&M Department of Chemical Engineering Faculty: Mark Holtzapple 
 StarRotor Corporation personnel 
 Texas A&M Department of Chemical Engineering Research: Mark Holtzapple

References 

Living people
American chemical engineers
Cornell University College of Engineering alumni
Texas A&M University faculty
People from Enid, Oklahoma
1956 births